Aberdeen Football Club Women, formerly known as Aberdeen Football Club Ladies, is a Scottish women's football club affiliated with Aberdeen Football Club that competes in Scottish Women's Premier League 1, the top tier of women's football in Scotland, after winning their second consecutive promotion in 2021.

History
Aberdeen F.C. Ladies was formed in January 2011, with the merger of Aberdeen City, Aberdeen University, East End Girls F.C. and Aberdeen Ladies & Girls F.C.

On 12 November 2017, after a 4–2 defeat to Stirling University, Aberdeen were relegated from the SWPL 1, the first tier of the Scottish Women's Premier League. When Stefan Laird left the club, Derek Gordon took over as interim head coach. In 2018, the team, who was left with only four players over the age of 20, finished seventh in the league and was once again relegated.

On 29 November 2018, Aberdeen F.C. launched Aberdeen F.C. Women; the club formalised its relationship with Aberdeen Ladies F.C., who will continue to operate teams from U7s to U19 National Performance League, and invited the senior team to Pittodrie Stadium to sign their official registration forms with the club and begin the process of integration with the club. They won the 2019 SWFL Division 1 – North, being immediately promoted back to the Scottish Women's Premier League 2.

Stadium
For their return to the top flight, Aberdeen are playing their home matches in 2021–22 at the Balmoral Stadium in the Cove Bay area of Aberdeen, home of Cove Rangers. They had previously played at Cormack Park, the Aberdeen F.C. training ground near Kingswells.

Current squad 
.

Honours
 Scottish Women's First Division
 Winners (2): 2003–04, 2011
 SWFL Division 1 – North
 Winners (1): 2019
 Scottish Women's Football League Cup
 Winners (1): 2011
 Scottish Women's Premier League
 Division 2 Winners (1): 2020-2021

References

External links
 Official website (Aberdeen F.C. Women)
 Official website (Aberdeen F.C. Ladies)
 Soccerway profile

Women's football clubs in Scotland
Football clubs in Aberdeen
Aberdeen F.C.
Scottish Women's Football League clubs
Scottish Women's Premier League clubs
Association football clubs established in 2011
2011 establishments in Scotland